Stony Fork Creek (shown as Stony Fork on federal maps) is a  tributary of Babb Creek in Tioga County, Pennsylvania in the United States.

Course
Stony Fork begins at the confluence of its east and west branches in the Tioga State Forest northwest of Morris. It flows south, receiving Black Run and Roland Run, both from the left. Stony Fork Road follows the entire length of the stream.

Stony Fork merges with Babb Creek near the unincorporated community of Doane, along Pennsylvania Route 414 between Morris and Blackwell. Babb Creek is a tributary of Pine Creek, a tributary of the West Branch Susquehanna River.

See also
List of rivers of Pennsylvania

References

Rivers of Pennsylvania
Rivers of Tioga County, Pennsylvania
Tributaries of Pine Creek (Pennsylvania)